Movin' It On is a live album by American folk singer Odetta, released in 1987. It is a recording of a concert at The Wisconsin Union Theatre, Madison, Wisconsin and was her first release in 12 years. It is out of print.

Track listing
"Give Me Your Hand"
"Sail Away, Ladies"
Suite, Ancestors 1:
"Roll on Buddy"
"Take This Hammer"
"Lowlands"
"Deep Blue Sea"
"Michael Rowed the Boat Ashore"
Suite, Ancestors 2:
"Ol' Howard's Dead & Gone"
"House of the Rising Sun"
"When I Was a Young Girl "
"Ol' Howard "
"Irene, Goodnight" (Lead Belly, Alan Lomax)
"Movin' It On" (Odetta Gordon)
"This Little Light Of Mine" (Harry Loes)

Personnel
Odetta – vocals, guitar, body percussion (left foot)
Technical
Marv Nonn - recording, mixing, engineer

References

Odetta live albums
1987 live albums